China–Seychelles relations refer to bilateral relations between China and Seychelles. China has an embassy in Victoria and Seychelles has an embassy in Beijing and a consulate in Shanghai.

Political ties
Diplomatic relations were established on June 30, 1976. China began providing Seychelles with diplomatic aide in 1977, including things such as constructing a poly-technical school and developing housing project in Les Mamelles. In 2002, China exported US$1.48 million worth of goods, while importing only $100,000 from Seychelles. The current Chinese ambassador to Seychelles is Wang Weiguo, who heads the embassy in Saint Louis, on the island of Mahe.

In 2011, the Seychelles government offered to China the possibility of establishing a port in Seychelles to supply ships fighting piracy off the coast of Somalia.

Chinese development finance to Seychelles
From 2000 to 2011, there are approximately 16 Chinese official development finance projects identified in Seychelles through various media reports. These projects range from a concessional loan of 300 million RMB in 2007, to a 321 million debt rescheduling in 2011, and a development aid grant worth US$8 million in 2011.

References

 
Bilateral relations of Seychelles
Seychelles
Africa–China relations